The Hamasen Museum of Taiwan Railway is a railway museum in Pier-2 Art Center, Yancheng District, Kaohsiung, Taiwan.

History
The museum building was originally constructed as a railway station. In 2003, the museum building was declared a historical building by the Kaohsiung City Government. On 9 November 2008, the last train departed from the station and soon later the station was closed down and the city government took over the ownership of the building. On 24 October 2010, the government granted the permit to Railway Culture Society to transform the building into a museum. museum was opened on 3 July 2016.

Architecture

The museum consists of the interactive exhibition, classic scene and Hamasen Pier-2 Line. It is located inside Warehouse B7 and B8.

Transportation
The museum is accessible within walking distance South West from Yanchengpu Station of Kaohsiung MRT.

See also
 List of museums in Taiwan

References

External links

 

2016 establishments in Taiwan
Museums established in 2016
Museums in Kaohsiung
Railway museums in Taiwan